Aconbury Camp is an Iron Age hillfort on Aconbury Hill in Herefordshire, England, about  south of Hereford, and near the village of Aconbury. It is a scheduled monument.

Description
At the south-east and south-west corners there are inturned entrances.

Excavation
The site was examined between 1948 and 1951; it was found that the ramparts seem to have internal revetments. Many pottery sherds, prehistoric and some Roman, were found. The material suggests occupation similar to that of the nearby hillforts Dinedor Camp and Sutton Walls.

Later history
During the English Civil War, the hill was occupied briefly in 1642 by a Royalist army under Lord Herbert; in 1645 it was occupied by a Scots army under the Earl of Leven who undertook an unsuccessful siege of Hereford in August that year.

See also
 Hillforts in Britain

References

Hill forts in Herefordshire
Scheduled monuments in Herefordshire
Former populated places in Herefordshire